Nanjing Road is a road in Shanghai.

Nanjing Road may also refer to
Nanjing Road (Taipei)
Nanjing East Road Station in Taipei
East Nanjing Road Station in Shanghai
West Nanjing Road Station in Shanghai